Herb Ellis Meets Jimmy Giuffre is an album by American jazz guitarist Herb Ellis and saxophonist, composer and arranger Jimmy Giuffre which was released on the Verve label in 1959.

Track listing 
 "Goose Grease" (Herb Ellis, Jimmy Giuffre) - 3:05
 "When Your Lover Has Gone" (Einar Aaron Swan) - 5:57
 "Remember" (Giuffre) - 7:43
 "Patricia" (Art Pepper) - 4:06
 "A Country Boy" (Ellis) - 5:06
 "You Know" (Giuffre) - 4:32
 "My Old Flame" (Sam Coslow, Arthur Johnston) - 3:32
 "People Will Say We're in Love" (Richard Rodgers, Oscar Hammerstein II) - 4:49

Personnel 
Herb Ellis - guitar
Jimmy Giuffre - tenor saxophone, arranger
Art Pepper, Bud Shank - alto saxophone
Richie Kamuca - tenor saxophone
Jim Hall - rhythm guitar
Lou Levy - piano
Joe Mondragon - bass
Stan Levey - drums

References 

Herb Ellis albums
Jimmy Giuffre albums
1959 albums
Verve Records albums